Ham Deog-won (born 12 July 1961) is a South Korean wrestler. He competed in the men's freestyle 130 kg at the 1988 Summer Olympics.

References

1961 births
Living people
South Korean male sport wrestlers
Olympic wrestlers of South Korea
Wrestlers at the 1988 Summer Olympics
Place of birth missing (living people)
20th-century South Korean people